Michael Steven Bublé  (born September 9, 1975) is a Canadian singer. A four-time Grammy Award winner, he is often credited for helping to renew public interest and appreciation for traditional pop standards and the Great American Songbook. His musical influences include Frank Sinatra, Dean Martin, Sammy Davis Jr., Tony Bennett, Nat King Cole, Bobby Darin, and Elvis Presley, and Sam Cooke.

In 2003, Bublé's first album reached the top ten in Canada and the United Kingdom. He found a worldwide audience with his 2005 album It's Time and his 2007 album Call Me Irresponsible – which reached number one on the Canadian Albums Chart, the UK Albums Chart, the US Billboard 200, the Australian ARIA Albums Chart and several European charts. His 2009 album Crazy Love debuted at number one on the US Billboard 200 after three days of sales, and remained there for two weeks. It was also his fourth number one album on Billboard's Top Jazz Albums chart. His 2011 holiday album, Christmas, was in first place on the Billboard 200 for the final four weeks of 2011 and the first week of 2012, totalling five weeks atop the chart, it also made the top 5 in the United Kingdom. With this, Christmas became his third-consecutive number-one album on the chart. To Be Loved was released in April 2013, followed by Nobody but Me in October 2016 and Love in November 2018.

Bublé has sold over 75 million records worldwide, and won numerous awards, including four Grammy Awards and multiple Juno Awards. He resides in the Vancouver area with his wife and children.

Early life and musical beginnings
Michael Steven Bublé was born in Burnaby, British Columbia, Canada on September 9, 1975, the son of Lewis Bublé, a fisherman with Croatian ancestry from Lošinj, and Amber (née Santaga), of Italian origin. Bublé's paternal grandparents were originally from Istria, while his maternal grandparents were from Italy. Bublé stated: "[On the side of the family native of modern-day Croatia] some say we're Yugoslavian, others that we're Italian." He has two younger sisters, Brandee, a children's book author, and Crystal, an actress. He and his siblings were raised Roman Catholic. He attended Seaforth Elementary School and Cariboo Hill Secondary School.

According to an Oprah Winfrey interview on October 10, 2009, Bublé dreamed of becoming a famous singer since he was two. When he was a teenager, he slept with his Bible and prayed to become a singer. His interest in jazz began at around age five when his family played Bing Crosby's White Christmas album. Other musical influences include Frank Sinatra, Dean Martin, and Elvis Presley, among others.

The first time his family noticed his singing talent was during the Christmas holidays, when Bublé was 13 years old, and they heard him powerfully sing the phrase "May your days be merry and bright" when the family was singing to the song "White Christmas" on a car ride.

Bublé also has a strong passion for ice hockey and wanted to become a professional hockey player for the Vancouver Canucks growing up, but believed he was not good enough. "I wanted so bad to be a hockey player... If I was any good at hockey, I probably wouldn't be singing right now." He often played hockey in his youth, watched Vancouver Canucks games with his father, and said that he "went to every single home game as a kid... I remember I wanted to be Gary Lupul, I wanted to be Patrik Sundstrom and Ivan Hlinka. I used to think that being named Michael Bublé was pretty cool because I was close to being called Jiri Bubla." Bublé shared his hockey interest with his grandfather.

From the age of 14, Bublé spent six years working during the summer as a commercial fisherman with his father and crewmates. He called the experience "the most deadly physical work I'll ever know in my lifetime. We'd be gone for two, sometimes three months at a time and the experience of living and working among guys over twice my age taught me a lot about responsibility and what it means to be a man."

His first singing engagements were in nightclubs at age 16 and were facilitated by his Italian grandfather Demetrio Santagà, a plumber from Preganziol, Treviso, who offered his plumbing services in exchange for stage time for his grandson. Bublé's grandfather paid for his singing lessons. Both his voice teacher, Sandi Siemens, and his maternal grandfather never stopped believing that he would become a star. Bublé's maternal grandmother, Iolanda (née Moscone), was also Italian, from Carrufo, L'Aquila.

As a children's entertainer he used the name "Mickey Bubbles".

Bublé grew up listening to his grandfather's collection of jazz records and credits his grandfather in encouraging his love for jazz music. "My grandfather was really my best friend growing up. He was the one who opened me up to a whole world of music that seemed to have been passed over by my generation. Although I like rock and roll and modern music, the first time my granddad played me the Mills Brothers, something magical happened. The lyrics were so romantic, so real, the way a song should be for me. It was like seeing my future flash before me. I wanted to be a singer and I knew that this was the music that I wanted to sing."

Bublé never stopped believing he would become a star but admitted he was probably the only one who believed in his dream, stating that even his maternal grandfather thought Bublé was going to be "an opening act for somebody in Las Vegas". He stated he never learned to read and write music, using only emotion to drive his songwriting ability.

At age 18, Bublé entered a local talent contest and won, but was disqualified by organizer Bev Delich for being underage. Delich entered him in the Canadian Youth Talent Search. After Bublé won that contest, he asked Delich to be his manager. Delich represented him for the next seven years, during which Bublé worked diligently at any job that came along: clubs, conventions, cruise ships, hotel lounges, shopping malls, and talent shows.

In 1996, Bublé appeared in TV's Death Game (aka Mortal Challenge) as a Drome Groupie. Also in 1996, he appeared (uncredited) in two episodes of The X-Files as a member of a submarine crew. His first national TV performance was on a 1997 award-winning Bravo! documentary titled Big Band Boom!, directed by Mark Glover Masterson. Beginning in 1997, he became a frequent guest on Vicki Gabereau's national talk show on the CTV network. During its first season, the Vancouver-based programme aired live, which ultimately worked in Bublé's favour. When a scheduled guest was forced to cancel, the show's music producer often asked Bublé to fill in at the last minute. The Gabereau appearances provided Bublé with great exposure, but they also helped the singer hone his television skills as a performer and as an interview guest. In a mutual show of gratitude, Bublé appeared on the final Gabereau show in 2005, along with Jann Arden and Elvis Costello.

Bublé received two Genie Award nominations for Best Original Song in 2000 for "I've Never Been in Love Before" and "Dumb ol' Heart", two songs he wrote for the film Here's to Life!. He recorded three independent albums: First Dance (1996), Babalu (2001), and Dream (2002).

Music career

2000–2002: Early career
Michael McSweeney, an aide to former prime minister Brian Mulroney, saw Bublé's performance at a business party and received a copy of Bublé's self-financed independent album. McSweeney showed the album to Mulroney and his wife. Bublé subsequently was invited to sing at the wedding of Mulroney's daughter, Caroline, where he sang Kurt Weill's "Mack the Knife". At the wedding, Bublé was introduced to David Foster, a multiple Grammy Award–winning producer and record executive who previously had worked with artists such as Madonna, Brandy Norwood, Whitney Houston, Michael Jackson, Céline Dion, Barbra Streisand, Kenny G, Cher, Josh Groban, and Andrea Bocelli.

David Foster was reluctant to sign Bublé to his 143 Records label because he "didn't know how to market this kind of music". Bublé moved to Los Angeles with his agent for a brief period to convince Foster to sign him. Eventually, Foster agreed to produce an album for him if he raised $500,000 to cover the costs of the production (which Bublé did). Foster ended up covering the costs of production under his label, with no assurances of support from Warner Brothers. Additionally, Bublé received the personal stamp of approval and support of Foster's friend, musician and songwriter Paul Anka. After David Foster agreed to produce Bublé's debut album, Bruce Allen, whom Bublé had pursued for years to be his manager, also signed Bublé. Bublé appeared as a karaoke singer in Duets in 2000 and a club owner in Totally Blonde in 2001.

2003–2004: Michael Bublé

Bublé's self-titled debut album was released on February 11, 2003, by 143 Records/Reprise Records. The album features a range of standards from various eras including "Fever", "The Way You Look Tonight", "For Once in My Life", "Moondance" and "You'll Never Find Another Love Like Mine". Also on the album is "How Can You Mend a Broken Heart?", with Barry Gibb of the Bee Gees singing backing vocals. The album went to the top 10 in Canada, United Kingdom, South Africa and reached No. 1 in Australia. It was No. 33 on the ARIA Top 100 Albums of 2003.

Bublé appeared nationally on television in the United States on the Today program on February 14, 2003. In November 2003, Bublé released a Christmas EP Let it Snow, containing five previously unreleased tracks, that peaked at 56 on the Billboard 200. The title track reached the top 40 of the Australia singles chart. A live DVD/CD called Come Fly with Me was released in early 2004. The Come Fly with Me CD was No. 99 on the Aria Top 100 Albums of 2004. The DVD included live footage and behind-the-scenes footage of Bublé's first world tour. The CD included three new studio tracks, two live recordings of new songs, and three live recordings of songs from the album Michael Bublé. The album peaked at 55 on the Billboard 200. In November 2004, the Christmas edition of his debut album was released as a two-disc set that included both the Michael Bublé and the Let It Snow EP.

Bublé won New Artist of the Year at the 2004 Juno Awards, and his album was nominated for Album of the Year but lost to Sam Roberts. He appeared in the 2003 film The Snow Walker. Also in 2003, he played a lounge performer on an episode of Days of Our Lives. In 2004, he appeared as himself in Las Vegas.

Songs from Bublé's debut album ("For Once in My Life", "Kissing a Fool") were released on the soundtrack for the movie Down with Love (2003). The soundtrack also included a previously unreleased duet with Holly Palmer of the movie's title theme. The Junkie XL remix of the theme for the 1960s TV cartoon version of Spider-Man from Bublé's Babalu album was played during the closing credits of Spider-Man 2 (2004), and this version was also released as a single. A CD was released in 2003 of the 7 songs that Bublé sang for Totally Blonde, calling it Totally Bublé. Bublé collaborated with the Barenaked Ladies for "Elf's Lament", a song on their 2004 Christmas album Barenaked for the Holidays.

2005–2006: It's Time

Bublé's second studio album, It's Time, was released on February 8, 2005, again by 143/Reprise Records. The album also included standards from a variety of eras including "You Don't Know Me", "Feeling Good", "Can't Buy Me Love", "Save the Last Dance for Me", "Song for You", and "Quando, Quando, Quando" (a duet with Canadian pop singer Nelly Furtado). It also included an original track, "Home", co-written by Bublé, his musical director Alan Chang, and Amy Foster-Gilles.

The album reached No. 1 in Canada, Italy, Japan, and on the Billboard Top Jazz chart, No. 2 in Australia, and No. 7 on the Billboard 200. Additionally it reached the top 10 in the United Kingdom, Switzerland, Norway, Austria, and Sweden. The album spent 104 weeks on the Billboard Top Jazz chart, including a record-breaking 78 weeks in the No. 1 spot. It's Time was Billboards Top Jazz Album in both 2005 and 2006. The first single, "Feeling Good", met with little commercial success. However, the second single from the album, "Home", reached No. 1 on the Billboard Adult Contemporary Tracks chart and No. 72 on the Billboard Hot 100. The third single "Save the Last Dance for Me" reached No. 5 on the Billboard AC Track Chart and No. 99 on the Billboard Hot 100.

In 2005, he appeared in a commercial for Starbucks' Frappucino line, singing his single "Come Fly with Me". The single appeared as a bonus track for a Starbucks edition release of It's Time.

He won four Juno Awards in 2006: Album of the Year and Pop Album of the Year (It's Time), Single of the Year ("Home"), and Artist of the Year.

He was nominated twice for a Grammy in the category Best Traditional Pop Vocal Album in 2006 (It's Time) and 2007 (Caught in the Act), but lost both times to Tony Bennett. In 2007, Bublé received one Juno nomination, for Fan Choice, but lost to Nelly Furtado.

2007–2008: Call Me Irresponsible
Bublé's third studio album, Call Me Irresponsible, was released on May 1, 2007, by 143/Reprise Records. His third effort included songs from different eras such as "Always on My Mind", "Dream", "I've Got the World on a String", and "Comin' Home Baby" (a duet with Boyz II Men). In the US, the album debuted at number two on the Billboard 200 and rose to number one in its second week. Only a few artists have been able to accomplish this, like Michael Jackson and Sugarland.

2009–2012: Crazy Love

His fourth studio album, Crazy Love, was set to be released by 143/Reprise Records on October 13, 2009. However, an early release in the United States happened on October 9, 2009, in which Bublé appeared on Oprah that same day and performed the album's first single "Haven't Met You Yet". The album was also promoted in an interview with George Stroumboulopoulos on The Hour on October 17, 2009, and on the December 22, 2009 episode of The Glenn Beck Program.

This album contains 12 tracks (and one bonus track), including two original songs co-written by Bublé, "Haven't Met You Yet" and "Hold On". Its first single, "Haven't Met You Yet", was released August 31, 2009, and reached No. 1 on Billboards Canadian Adult Contemporary chart. Most of the tracks off the album were recorded live because Bublé did not want his album to sound overproduced and slick. Bublé wrote the opening part for his cover on the single "Cry Me a River" in Bond-like theme because he wanted the song to sound very cinematic and bombastic. Crazy Love debuted at No. 1 on the Billboard 200 chart, becoming Bublé's fourth No. 1 album on Billboards Top Jazz Albums chart. It also debuted at No. 1 in Australia and Canada, where it became his fastest-selling album. The album was supported by the Crazy Love Tour. During the tour, Bublé performed two nights at the new Aviva Stadium in Dublin, Ireland, which were the first concerts to take place at the venue.

On April 18, 2010, Bublé won four Juno Awards for Juno Fan Choice Award, Single of the Year ("Haven't Met You Yet"), Album of the Year (Crazy Love) and Pop Album of the Year (Crazy Love), plus two Juno nominations for Artist of the Year and Songwriter of the Year. Crazy Love producers David Foster and Bob Rock both received two separate nominations of their own for the Jack Richardson Producer of the Year Award, with Bob Rock winning the award.

Bublé re-released Crazy Love on October 25, 2010, in the US, with an earlier release date of October 15, 2010 for Europe. The special edition is called "Crazy Love: Hollywood Edition", and contains several bonus tracks including Bublé's newest single, "Hollywood", co-written with Toronto songwriter and pianist Robert G. Scott. On September 7, 2010, "Hollywood" was released worldwide on radio and as a digital single on iTunes. He recently played to 100,000 people at the Aviva Stadium in Dublin, his biggest concert to date.

In October 2011, Bublé released his fifth studio album, Christmas, which rose to the top of the US and UK charts. Christmas has been the best-selling Christmas album in Australia each year since its release.

Olympics and TV
Bublé took part in the torch relay in Vancouver before the opening ceremony of the 2010 Winter Olympics. He performed on the Today Show on February 12, the day of the opening ceremony and during the broadcast on Grouse Mountain. The introduction for his song "Cry Me a River" was chosen as the theme for the BBC's coverage of the Winter Olympics.

He performed with other Canadian celebrities at the closing ceremony, singing a version of "Maple Leaf Forever" and appearing as a Mountie but having his uniform torn off to reveal a white tuxedo. He appeared in the TV special Michael Bublé's Canada, which aired on Australian cable television in January, ahead of the 2010 Winter Games.

He was a guest on the comedy TV program Colbert Report for Colbert's 2010 Vancouver Winter Games coverage.

In 2009, he appeared with neuroscientist Daniel Levitin on the television program My Musical Brain, which was based on Levitin's book This Is Your Brain on Music. Also in 2009, he took part in series 6 of The X Factor in the UK. He was the celebrity mentor for the finalists in week 3 and also appeared on the finale, duetting with Stacey Solomon.

He was featured in an ITV special called This Is Michael Bublé. On February 23, 2011, he was the narrator of BBC Radio 2's Song Stories "My Way".

2013–2017: To Be Loved and Nobody but Me
Bublé released To Be Loved on April 15, 2013 (regional releases include April 22 in Canada and April 23 in the US). The lead single, "It's a Beautiful Day", was released on February 25, 2013. To Be Loved debuted at number-one on the Billboard 200, becoming the crooner's fourth consecutive number-one album on the chart.

He was featured in the ITV documentary Michael Bublé's Day Off which aired on June 30, 2013. On December 18, 2013, he performed his 3rd Annual Christmas Special with NBC. Special guests included Mariah Carey, Mary J. Blige, Queen Latifah, and David Foster.

The To Be Loved Tour was the fifth concert tour by Canadian singer Michael Bublé. Launched in support of his sixth studio album To Be Loved (2013), the tour began on June 30, 2013, with a series of ten concerts at The O2 Arena in London and ended on March 22, 2015, in Johannesburg.

To advertise Michael Bublé's Christmas in Hollywood on NBC, he released a Christmas song called "The More You Give (The More You'll Have)".

His seventh studio album, Nobody but Me, was released on October 21, 2016.

The titular lead single features Black Thought of The Roots and was released on August 19, 2016. During the same month, his perfume went on sale in thirty countries.

2018–2021: Love

His eighth studio album Love (written as the heart emoji, ❤️) was released on November 16, 2018, with the first single "When I Fall in Love" preceding it on September 27, 2018. In November, he announced he would embarking on a tour in 2019 in honor of the album; his An Evening with Michael Bublé tour kicked off in Tampa on February 13, 2019.

On December 15, 2018, Bublé was the musical guest for the final of the sixteenth edition of BBC's Strictly Come Dancing. On January 17, 2019, it was announced that Bublé would star in a Super Bowl commercial for Bubly sparkling water.

2022–present: Higher
On January 29, 2022, Bublé announced that his ninth studio album, Higher, would be released on March 25. The album was his first studio album since Love (2018).

Dancing With The Stars on Disney+ celebrated "Michael Bublé Night" on October 24, 2022 with Bublé serving as a guest judge, and performing two songs, including Higher.

Personal life
Bublé resides in Burnaby, British Columbia with his wife and children. He once had a home in Croydon, London.

He holds dual Italian–Canadian citizenship.

An avid hockey fan since childhood, he is a prominent celebrity supporter of the Vancouver Canucks. Since December 2008, he has co-owned the Vancouver Giants. Bublé requires "one local team hockey puck" in his dressing room as part of his contract to concert promoters in every city.

In 2019, he renovated his late grandfather's Vancouver home and gifted it to his caretaker.

Relationships
Bublé was previously engaged to actress Debbie Timuss, who appeared with him in the musicals Red Rock Diner in 1996 and Dean Regan's Forever Swing in 1998. Timuss was listed as one of the dedicatees in Bublé's self-titled album Michael Bublé and It's Time and sang background vocals for it. While in Italy, he co-wrote the hit single "Home" for her. She was featured in the music video for "Home". Their engagement ended in November 2005 and inspired him to write "Lost".

During an appearance at Australian television's Logie Awards in 2005, Bublé met English actress Emily Blunt and they soon began dating. She sang background vocals on "Me and Mrs. Jones", and "Everything" was written by Bublé for her.

After his relationship with Blunt ended in July 2008, Bublé began dating Argentine actress Luisana Lopilato; they became engaged in November 2009 and married in March 2011 in Buenos Aires. Bublé co-wrote the hit single "Haven't Met You Yet" for Lopilato while they were dating and she appeared in his music video. The couple have four children: sons born in 2013 and 2016 and daughters born in 2018 and 2022.

Bublé's oldest son was diagnosed with hepatoblastoma in 2016. The singer canceled his planned tour after receiving news of the diagnosis, spending time with his son during chemotherapy and radiotherapy. Bublé discussed this with British talk show host James Corden in 2018. Bublé's son has since fully recovered.

Discography

 BaBalu (2001)
 Dream (2002)
 Michael Bublé (2003)
 It's Time (2005)
 Caught in the Act (album with DVD, 2005)
 Call Me Irresponsible (2007)
 Crazy Love (2009)
 Christmas (2011)
 To Be Loved (2013)
 Nobody but Me (2016)
 Love (2018)
 Higher (2022)

Concert tours and residency
 Michael Bublé: Live in Concert (2004)
 It's Time Tour (2005–2006)
 Call Me Irresponsible Tour (2007–2008)
 Crazy Love Tour (2010–2012)
 To Be Loved Tour (2013–2015)
 An Evening with Michael Bublé (2019–2022)
 Higher Tour (2022-2023)

Residencies
A Las Vegas Limited Engagement (2022)

Filmography
Film

Television

Awards and nominations

American Music Awards

|-
| 2006 || rowspan=2| Michael Bublé || rowspan=2| Favorite Adult Contemporary Artist || 
|-
| 2010 || 
|}

ARIA Music Awards

! Lost to
|-
| 2010 || Michael Bublé || rowspan=3 | Best International Artist || rowspan=3  || Mumford & Sons
|-
| 2012 || rowspan=2| Christmas ||  One Direction - Up All Night 
|-
| 2013  || One Direction - Take Me Home
|}

Billboard Music Awards

|-
| 2011 || rowspan=2 | Michael Bublé || Top Touring Artist || rowspan=4 
|-
| rowspan=3 | 2012 || Top Billboard 200 Artist 
|-
| rowspan=2 | Christmas || Top Billboard 200 Album  
|-
| Top Pop Album 
|}

Brit Awards

|-
| 2008 || rowspan=3 | Michael Bublé || rowspan=3 | International Male Solo Artist || rowspan=3 
|-
| 2010 
|-
| 2013 
|}

Grammy Awards

|-
| 2006 || It's Time || rowspan=2 | Best Traditional Pop Vocal Album || rowspan=3 
|-
| 2007 || Caught in the Act 
|-
| rowspan=2| 2008 || "Everything" || Best Male Pop Vocal Performance 
|-
| Call Me Irresponsible || rowspan=2| Best Traditional Pop Vocal Album || rowspan=2 
|-
| 2010 || Michael Bublé Meets Madison Square Garden 
|-
| rowspan=2| 2011 || "Haven't Met You Yet" || Best Male Pop Vocal Performance || 
|-
| Crazy Love || rowspan=6 | Best Traditional Pop Vocal Album || 
|-
| 2013 || Christmas || 
|-
| 2014 || To Be Loved || 
|-
| 2018 || Nobody But Me || rowspan=2  
|-
| 2020 || Love (Deluxe Edition) 
|-
|2023 || Higher|| 
|}

Juno Awards

|-
| rowspan=2 | 2004 || Michael Bublé || Breakthrough Artist of the Year || 
|-
| Michael Bublé || rowspan=2| Album of the Year || 
|-
| rowspan=5 | 2006 || rowspan=2| It's Time || rowspan=4 
|-
| Pop Album of the Year 
|-
| "Home" || Single of the Year 
|-
| rowspan=5| Michael Bublé || Artist of the Year 
|-
| rowspan=3 | Fan Choice Award || rowspan=2 
|-
| 2007 
|-
| rowspan=5 | 2008 || 
|-
| Artist of the Year || rowspan=5 
|-
| rowspan=2| Call Me Irresponsible || Album of the Year 
|-
| Pop Album of the Year  
|-
| "Everything" || rowspan=3| Single of the Year
|-
| 2009 || "Lost" 
|-
| rowspan=6 | 2010 || "Haven't Met You Yet" ||rowspan=3 
|-
| rowspan=2 | Crazy Love || Album of the Year 
|-
| Pop Album of the Year 
|-
| rowspan=4 | Michael Bublé || Artist of the Year || rowspan=2 
|-
| Songwriter of the Year
|-
| rowspan=2 | Fan Choice Award || 
|-
| 2011 || 
|-
| rowspan=3 | 2012 || Christmas || Album of the Year || 
|-
| rowspan=3| Michael Bublé || Artist of the Year || rowspan=8 
|-
| rowspan=2 | Fan Choice Award 
|-
| 2013 
|-
| rowspan=5| 2014 || "It's a Beautiful Day" || Single of the Year 
|-
| rowspan=2| To Be Loved || Album of the Year 
|-
| Pop Album of the Year 
|-
| rowspan=3 | Michael Bublé || Artist of the Year
|-
| rowspan=2 | Fan Choice Award 
|-
| 2015 || 
|-
| rowspan=2| 2018 || rowspan=2| Nobody but Me || Album of the Year || 
|-
| rowspan=2| Adult Contemporary Album of the Year || rowspan=2 
|-
| rowspan=3 | 2019 || Love 
|-
| rowspan=2 | Michael Bublé || Artist of the Year || rowspan=2 
|-
| Producer of the Year 
|}

People's Choice Awards

|-
| 2007 || "Save the Last Dance for Me" || Favorite Remake ||rowspan=4 
|-
| 2011 || rowspan=2 | Michael Bublé || rowspan="2" | Favorite Male Artist 
|-
| rowspan=2 | 2014 
|-
| To Be Loved'' || Favorite Album 
|}

iHeartRadio Much Music Video Awards

|-
| 2005 || "Home" || rowspan=3 | MuchMoreMusic Award || 
|-
| 2006 || "Save the Last Dance for Me" || 
|-
| 2007 || "Everything" || 
|}

Other awards

References

External links

 
 
 Michael Bublé lyrics and biography 

Michael Bublé
Living people
1975 births
20th-century Canadian male actors
20th-century Canadian male singers
21st-century Canadian male actors
21st-century Canadian male singers
Canadian baritones
Canadian expatriate musicians in the United States
Canadian expatriates in Italy
Canadian jazz singers
Canadian male film actors
Canadian male jazz musicians
Canadian male singers
Canadian male television actors
Canadian people of Croatian descent
Canadian people of Italian descent
Canadian philanthropists
Canadian pop singers
Canadian record producers
Canadian Roman Catholics
Canadian Screen Award winners
Canadian songwriters
Crooners
Easy listening musicians
Grammy Award winners
Jazz-pop singers
Juno Award for Adult Contemporary Album of the Year winners
Juno Award for Album of the Year winners
Juno Award for Artist of the Year winners
Juno Award for Breakthrough Artist of the Year winners
Juno Award for Pop Album of the Year winners
Juno Award for Single of the Year winners
Juno Fan Choice Award winners
Male actors from British Columbia
Members of the Order of British Columbia
Musicians from British Columbia
Naturalised citizens of Italy
Nightclub performers
Officers of the Order of Canada
People from Burnaby
Reprise Records artists
Swing singers
Traditional pop music singers
Warner Music Group artists
World Music Awards winners